Kristy Debono is a Maltese politician, member of the Parliament for District 9 since she was elected on 2013 and re-elected on 2017.  In 2017 she exceeded her quota on first count votes making her the only female member of parliament to get elected as such in 2017.   She forms part of the Nationalist Party. On 5 November 2017 was elected president of the General Council of the Nationalist Party.

During her two legislatures in Parliament, Kristy Debono was appointed Opposition spokesperson of Economy and Financial Services.  She also served as Governor in the Lands Authority Board of Governors on behalf of the Opposition.

Kristy Debono is married to Jean Pierre Debono, who also got elected as a Member of Parliament during the 2017 General elections.

Notes 

Living people
Nationalist Party (Malta) politicians
Members of the House of Representatives of Malta
21st-century Maltese women politicians
21st-century Maltese politicians
Academic staff of the University of Malta
Year of birth missing (living people)